Chroy Changvar is a satellite city in Phnom Penh, Cambodia.

Administration 
Chroy Changvar is subdivided into 5 Sangkats and 22 Phums.

References

Districts of Phnom Penh